"I'm Gonna Sit Right Down and Cry (Over You)" is a popular song written in 1953 by Joe Thomas and Howard Biggs and originally recorded by Roy Hamilton in 1954. Since then, it became something of a minor pop standard, largely due to several well-received versions of the song. It is best known for appearing on Elvis Presley's first album, and for a performance of the song by The Beatles (which appears on their Live at the BBC album). The Beatles also performed the song at the Star-Club in Hamburg on New Year's Eve, 31 December 1962, during their fifth and final Hamburg residency. This version appears on their album, Live! at the Star-Club in Hamburg, Germany; 1962.

The Beatles version
The Beatles recorded their version on July 16, 1963, at the BBC Paris Studio in London for the Pop Go The Beatles radio show. The recording went unreleased until 1994 when it was released on Live at the BBC.

The Beatles version is different than Presley's version in that is more rock 'n' roll while Presley's version is in a more rockabilly country style.

This is one of three Presley songs recorded by the Beatles for BBC radio, the others being "I Forgot to Remember to Forget" and "That's All Right".

Personnel
 John Lennon – vocals, lead guitar
 Paul McCartney – vocals, bass
 George Harrison – rhythm guitar
 Ringo Starr – drums

Notes

See also
1953 in music

1953 songs
Rockabilly songs
Elvis Presley songs
The Beatles songs
Songs written by Howard Biggs